Mount Marcy is the highest summit of the Adirondack Mountains and the State of New York.

Mount Marcy may also refer to:

 Damsire of the horse Avatar

See also
 Mount Mary (disambiguation)
 Mount Mercy (disambiguation)